Mestis (from , meaning 'Championship series') is the second-highest men's ice hockey league in Finland. The league was established by the Finnish Ice Hockey Association in 2000 to replace the I-divisioona ('First Division'). 

Mestis is the highest league that can be reached through playing merits alone. Being promoted to Liiga is only possible if a team's Liiga license application is accepted. Mestis, however, is an open league where relegation and promotion are possible with the 3rd league, Suomi-sarja.

Mestis is also the highest league governed by the FIHA.

History 
In the years 2000–2008, it was not practically possible for Mestis teams to get promoted to the SM-liiga, which was closed in 2000, but it was possible to drop down to the Suomi-sarja instead. However, KalPa was promoted to the SM-liiga in the spring of 2005, when the number of teams in the league was increased from 13 to 14 teams. For the 2008–2009 season, the SM-liiga qualifiers were brought back for a few seasons, but in the 2013–2014 season, the qualifiers were removed again. After the elimination of the qualifiers, Sport, KooKoo and Jukurit have been promoted to the SM-liiga through the license system.

Mestis got a new team, HK Zemgale/LLU, from Latvia for the 2022–23 season. HK Zemgale had never played in a Finnish league before and was added to Mestis to bring more entertainment and internationalization to Finnish ice hockey. 

According to Mestis themselves, they are talking with other international clubs about joining the Mestis league.

Clubs

Past participants 
 Jää-Kotkat, relegated to the Suomi-sarja in 2003.
 Hyvinkään Ahmat, relegated to the Suomi-sarja in 2004.
KalPa, promoted to the SM-liiga in 2005.
Haukat, resigned in 2006.
HC Salamat relegated to the Suomi-sarja in 2008.
Kotkan Titaanit relegated to the Suomi-sarja in 2009.
Kiekko-Laser went bankrupt in 2011.
Vaasan Sport, promoted to the Liiga in 2014.
HC Keski-Uusimaa was abandoned serial place in 2014.
KooKoo, promoted to the Liiga in 2015.
Jukurit, promoted to the Liiga in 2016.
JYP-Akatemia, relegated to the Suomi-sarja and folded in 2017.
Espoo United, went bankrupt in 2018.
LeKi, did not receive a license in 2019.
SaPKo, went bankrupt in 2022.

Mestis timeline
{| class="wikitable" style="font-size: 80%;"
|- bgcolor="#f0f0f0"
| 2000–01 || 2001–02 || 2002–03 || 2003–04 || 2004–05 || 2005–06 || 2006–07 || 2007–08 || 2008–09 || 2009–10 || 2010–11 || 2011–12 || 2012–13 || 2013–14|| 2014–15|| 2015–16 || 2016–17 || 2017–18 || 2018–19 || 2019–20 || 2020–21
|2021–22
|2022–23
|- bgcolor="#e0e0e0"
| colspan="23" style="color: white; background-color: #316bb5" | K-Vantaa 
|- bgcolor="#e0e0e0" 
| colspan=11 style="color: white; background-color: #000062" | TuTo || colspan="12" style="color:white; background-color: #000062" | TUTO Hockey
|- bgcolor="#e0e0e0"
| colspan=16 style="color: white; background-color: #f7ce00" | Jukurit || colspan="7" |
|- bgcolor="#e0e0e0"
| colspan=15 style="color: white; background-color: black" | KooKoo || colspan="8" |
|- bgcolor="#e0e0e0"
| colspan=14 style="color: white; background-color: #fd1812" | Sport || colspan="9" |
|- bgcolor="#e0e0e0"
| colspan=7 style="background-color: green" | FPS || colspan= 3 | 
| colspan="10" | || colspan="3" style="background-color: green" |
|- bgcolor="#e0e0e0"
| colspan=6 style="background-color: #d8000b" | Hermes || colspan= 4 | || colspan=5 | || colspan="8" style="background-color: #d8000b" |
|- bgcolor="#e0e0e0"
| colspan=6 style="background-color: black" |  Haukat || colspan= 4 | || colspan="13" |
|- bgcolor="#e0e0e0"
| colspan=4 style="background-color: red" |  Ahmat || colspan= 6 | || colspan="13" |
|- bgcolor="#e0e0e0"
| colspan=3 style="background-color: blue" | UJK || colspan= 7 | || colspan="13" |
|- bgcolor="#e0e0e0"
| colspan=2 style="color: white; background-color: #16286a" | Diskos ||colspan= 6 | || colspan=3 style="color: white; background-color: #16286a" | D Team ||colspan=6 style="color: white; background-color: black" | JYP-Akatemia || colspan="6" |
|- bgcolor="#e0e0e0"
| style="background-color: #dd2200" | Jokipojat ||colspan=3 | || colspan=10 style="background-color: #dd2200" | || || colspan=5 style="background-color: #dd2200" | || colspan="3" style="background-color: #dd2200" | JoKP|- bgcolor="#e0e0e0"
| colspan=1| || colspan=4 style="background-color: black" | KalPa || colspan=5 | || colspan="13" |
|- bgcolor="#e0e0e0"
|colspan=2| || colspan=15 style="color:red; background-color: red" | Hokki || colspan=2 | || colspan="4" style="background-color: #0667ac" | Hokki|- bgcolor="#e0e0e0"
| colspan=3| || colspan=5 style="background-color: #0667ac" |  HCK Salamat || colspan=2 | || colspan="13" |
|- bgcolor="#e0e0e0"
| colspan=6| || colspan=6 style="background-color: #be0027" | HeKi || colspan="11" style="background-color: #be0027" | Peliitat|- bgcolor="#e0e0e0"
| colspan=6| || colspan=15 style="background-color: #1e264e" | SaPKo 
| colspan="2" |
|- bgcolor="#e0e0e0"
| colspan=6| || style="background-color: black" | KOOVEE || colspan=3 | || colspan = 8 | || colspan="5" style="background-color: black" |
|- bgcolor="#e0e0e0"
| colspan=7| || colspan=12 style="background-color: #07239e" | LeKi|| colspan="4" |
|- bgcolor="#e0e0e0"
| colspan=7| || colspan=2 style="background-color: #dd2200" | Titaanit || || colspan="13" |
|- bgcolor="#e0e0e0"
| colspan=9| || style="background-color: #0444e4" | RoKi || colspan=5 | || colspan="8" style="background-color: #0444e4" |
|- bgcolor="#e0e0e0"
| colspan=10| || colspan=2 style="background-color: purple" | K-Laser || colspan="11" |
|- bgcolor="#e0e0e0"
| colspan=10| || colspan=2 | || colspan=2 style="background-color: blue" | HCK || colspan="9" |
|- bgcolor="#e0e0e0"
| colspan=10| || colspan=4 | || colspan="9" style="background-color: #0056ad" | KeuPa HT|- bgcolor="#e0e0e0"
| colspan=10| || colspan=6 | || colspan="7" style="background-color: black" | IPK 
|- bgcolor="#e0e0e0"
| colspan=10| || colspan=6 | || colspan=2 style="background-color: #013E7F" | Espoo United || colspan="5" |
|- bgcolor="#e0e0e0"
| colspan=10| || colspan=7 | || colspan="6" style="background-color: #0251c7" | Ketterä|- bgcolor="#e0e0e0"
| colspan=10| || colspan=10 | || colspan="3" style="background-color: #00529C" | K-Espoo 
|- bgcolor="#e0e0e0"
| colspan="10" |
| colspan="12" | || colspan="1" style="background-color: #0c78dd" | HK Zemgale 
|}

WinnersMedaltable:'''

References

External links 
Mestis Official website (in Finnish)

 
Professional ice hockey leagues in Finland
Fin